Long Ashton railway station was a railway station on the Bristol to Exeter line,  southwest of , serving the village of Long Ashton in North Somerset, England. There were two stations on the site, the first, called "Ashton", opened in either 1841 or 1852 and closed in 1856. The second station, originally known as "Long Ashton Platform" before being renamed as "Long Ashton" in 1929, was operational from 1926 to 1941. The site is now partly under the A370 Long Ashton Bypass, and there are no visible remains of the station. There is local support for the station to be reopened, possibly sited further to the west, and possibly as part of the University of Bristol's proposed Fenswood Farm development.

First station 
Quite when the station opened is uncertain – Butt's Directory of Railway Stations states that the station opened with the line in June 1841, but Quick's Railway Passenger Stations states it only opened in June 1852. Both sources agree that the station closed in January 1856, however other sources such as Oakley's Somerset Railway Stations contain no reference to Ashton at all. If the earlier date is correct, services would have originally been provided by the Great Western Railway on behalf of the Bristol & Exeter. The Bristol & Exeter took over passenger operations on 1 May 1849.

The line through Ashton remained open after the station closed. In 1871, the Bristol & Exeter opened another station called Ashton, closer to Bristol, this station was later renamed . The line had been reconstructed as mixed-gauge by 1 June 1875 to accommodate local traffic. A year later in 1876, the Bristol & Exeter was amalgamated into the Great Western Railway, which took over services. Broad-gauge trains ceased operation on 20 May 1892.

Second station 

The station was reopened by the Great Western Railway in 1926, now called Long Ashton Platform; Ashton by then was the name of a station on the Teign Valley Line in Devon. Again, the exact date of opening is disputed: most sources state 12 July 1926, but some say 20 September the same year. It was located on the same site as the first station.

The station was a basic halt, and had two  platforms. A corrugated iron shelter and lamp hut were provided on the westbound platform, and a small booking office was present on the road to the platform. The estimated cost of construction was £1,930.

The station was renamed Long Ashton on 23 September 1929, and closed on 6 October 1941. There is now no trace of it left, and the site is now partly under the A370 Long Ashton Bypass causeway.

Future 

The University notes that there is positive support for the station, but that it alone cannot guarantee its construction. Long Ashton parish councillor Anthony Butcher opposes the development, but supports the reopening of the station. The station could be reopened  as part of the Greater Bristol Metro scheme, a rail transport plan approved in July 2012 which aims to enhance transport capacity in the Bristol area.

The Bristol to Exeter line through Long Ashton is not currently electrified. The group Friends of Suburban Bristol Railways supports the electrification continuing to Weston, as does Member of Parliament for Weston-super-Mare, John Penrose.

Notes

References 

Disused railway stations in Somerset
Former Great Western Railway stations
Railway stations in Great Britain opened in 1841
Railway stations in Great Britain opened in 1852
Railway stations in Great Britain closed in 1856
Railway stations in Great Britain opened in 1926
Railway stations in Great Britain closed in 1941
1841 establishments in England